Toward Independence is a 1948 American short documentary film about the rehabilitation of veterans with spinal cord injuries. Army Surgeon General Raymond W. Bliss received the award. In 1949, it won an Oscar for Documentary Short Subject at 21st Academy Awards. The Academy Film Archive preserved Toward Independence in 2005.

References

Sources

External links

Toward Independence at the National Archives and Records Administration

1948 films
1948 short films
1948 documentary films
1940s short documentary films
American short documentary films
American black-and-white films
Best Documentary Short Subject Academy Award winners
Black-and-white documentary films
1940s English-language films
1940s American films